German submarine U-272 was a type VIIC U-boat of Nazi Germany's Kriegsmarine in World War II. She was laid down on 28 November 1941, launched on 15 August 1942 and commissioned on 7 October that year under the command of Oberleutnant zur See Horst Hepp. She served in the 8th U-boat flotilla, a training unit and never reached operational status.

Design
German Type VIIC submarines were preceded by the shorter Type VIIB submarines. U-272 had a displacement of  when at the surface and  while submerged. She had two shafts and two  propellers.

U-272 was fitted with five  torpedo tubes (four fitted at the bow and one at the stern), fourteen torpedoes, one  SK C/35 naval gun, 220 rounds, and two twin  C/30 anti-aircraft guns. The boat had a complement of between forty-four and sixty.

References

Bibliography

External links

1942 ships
World War II submarines of Germany
U-boats commissioned in 1942
Ships built in Bremen (state)
U-boats sunk in collisions
German Type VIIC submarines
U-boats sunk in 1942
Maritime incidents in November 1942
Shipwrecks of Poland